Matthew Desmond is a  sociologist and the Maurice P. During Professor of Sociology at Princeton University, where he is also the principal investigator of the Eviction Lab. Desmond was elected to the American Philosophical Society in 2022.

Education
Desmond studied as an undergraduate at Arizona State University, serving at the same time as a volunteer with Habitat for Humanity in Tempe. In 2002, he graduated from ASU with a B.S. degree, summa cum laude in communications and justice studies. He received a Ph.D. in sociology from the University of Wisconsin-Madison. He was formerly the John L. Loeb Associate Professor of the Social Sciences at Harvard University.

Honors
Desmond was awarded a Harvey Fellowship in 2006 and a MacArthur Fellowship in 2015. He won the 2017 Pulitzer Prize for General Nonfiction, the 2017 PEN/John Kenneth Galbraith Award, and the 2016 National Book Critics Circle Award for his work about poverty, Evicted: Poverty and Profit in the American City. His 2017 Pulitzer Prize citation read, "For a deeply researched exposé that showed how mass evictions after the 2008 economic crash were less a consequence than a cause of poverty."

Works

Emirbayer, Mustafa and Matthew Desmond (2009). Racial Domination, Racial Progress: The Sociology of Race in America. New York: McGraw-Hill. 

Desmond, Matthew (2016). Evicted: Poverty and Profit in the American City. New York: Crown/Archetype, 2016. 
Desmond, Matthew (2018). "Why Work Doesn't Work Anymore." New York Times Magazine, p. 36, September 16, 2018.
Desmond, Matthew (2019). "American Capitalism Is Brutal. You Can Trace That to the Plantation." New York Times Magazine, 2019 (part of The 1619 Project).
Desmond, Matthew (2021), "Capitalism", chapter in The 1619 Project: A New Origin Story.
Desmond, Matthew (2023). Poverty, by America. New York: Crown, 2023.

References

External links

 Official page of "Evicted"
 

American sociologists
Urban theorists
Living people
MacArthur Fellows
Pulitzer Prize for General Non-Fiction winners
Arizona State University alumni
University of Wisconsin–Madison alumni
21st-century American male writers
21st-century American non-fiction writers
Harvard University faculty
Princeton University faculty
American male non-fiction writers
Year of birth missing (living people)
1970s births
Members of the American Philosophical Society